Patrick Joseph Urda (born August 26, 1976) is an American lawyer who serves as a judge of the United States Tax Court.

Early life 

Urda grew up in South Bend, Indiana with four siblings, where his father Richard was a tax lawyer and his mother Kathleen taught statistics at St. Mary's College.

Education 

Urda received his Bachelor of Arts degree in classics, summa cum laude, from the University of Notre Dame, where he was inducted into Phi Beta Kappa. He received his Juris Doctor from Harvard Law School.

Legal career 

At the start of his legal career, Urda spent three years in private practice and served as a law clerk to Judge Daniel Anthony Manion of the United States Court of Appeals for the Seventh Circuit.

Department of Justice career 

Before becoming a judge, Urda was counsel to the Deputy Assistant Attorney General in the United States Department of Justice Tax Division, where he advised the Deputy Assistant Attorney General and Tax Division front office on legal and administrative issues facing the Division, particularly regarding appellate and settlement matters. In addition to acting as counsel, he was a member of the Tax Division's Appellate Section, which he joined in 2006.

While working in the Appellate Section, he litigated more than eighty appeals from the United States Tax Court and the United States District Courts and has presented oral argument on behalf of the United States in more than forty-five appeals, including arguments in each of the United States Courts of Appeals. He was also one of the principal drafters of the United States' successful brief in Hall v. United States, 566 U.S. 506 (2012).

Awards 

Urda is a five-time recipient of the Tax Division's Outstanding Attorney Award, and has received the IRS's Mitchell Rogovin Award.

United States Tax Court service 

On August 3, 2017, President Donald Trump nominated Urda to serve as a Judge of the United States Tax Court, to the seat vacated by Judge Diane Kroupa, who retired on June 16, 2014. The Senate Finance Committee held a hearing on his nomination on June 12, 2018, and then reported his nomination unanimously on June 28, 2018. On August 28, 2018, his nomination was confirmed by voice vote. He assumed office as a judge on September 27, 2018.

References

External links 

1976 births
Living people
21st-century American lawyers
21st-century American judges
Harvard Law School alumni
Indiana lawyers
Judges of the United States Tax Court
People from South Bend, Indiana
United States Article I federal judges appointed by Donald Trump
United States Department of Justice lawyers
University of Notre Dame alumni